Type C8-class ships are a type of Heavy Lift Barge Carrier. Type C8 ships were the 8th type of ship designed by the United States Maritime Commission (MARCOM) in the late 1960s. As done with the Type C1 ships and Type C2 ships, MARCOM circulated preliminary plans for comment. The design presented was not specific to any service or trade route.

Design
The Type C8 ships are a type of Heavy Lighter aboard ship.  The lighter aboard ship or LASH is a system for loading barges or (lighters) onto a large vessel for transport. At the destination, the barge are unloaded and the vessel is then free to move on to the next shipment. Barges and lighters are usually unpowered floating platforms for inland waterways that are separated from the open seas.  Barge and lighters are typically towed or pushed around harbors, canals or rivers by tugboats. The carrier ships are also known as LASH carriers, barge carriers, kangaroo ships and lighter transport ships. Barges are load into the ship from the rear-stern of the ship.   Two barge-lighters weighing up to 1,000 metric tons placed onto an underwater platform. The ship raises the platform up to the deck. On the deck are special rails to move the lighters down the length of the ship to their holding spot. The ship as a loading power to lift with a force of more than 2,000 Mp.

MARAD Design C8-S-81b
In the late 1960s, shipbuilding engineer Jerome L. Goldman designed the first LASH ships the Acadia Forest and the Atlantic Forest. Avondale shipyard start construction in 1969 of the second LASH ships the C8-S-81b. The eleven C8-S-81b LASH ships were of identical design and built from 1970 to 1973. The 11 ships were used by two shipping lines Prudential Grace Line in New York and Pacific Far East Line in San Francisco. The price for each ship was $21.3 million.

Ships in type
 Avondale Industries built eleven C8-S-81b at 29,820 DWT each in 1970 - 1971 for the Grace Line. Example is the SS Lash Turkiye.
 Fore River Shipyard by General Dynamics Corporation Quincy, Massachusetts built three C8-S-82a at 20,574 DWT each in 1972. The three built for the Lykes Brothers Steamship Company: SS Doctor Lykes, SS Almeria Lykes and SS Tillie Lykes.
 Bethlehem Sparrows Point Shipyard built two C8-S-85d at 27,340 DWT each in 1979. The Austral Pioneer and Austral Puritan for the Farrell Lines.

US Navy Cape M Class Heavy Lift Barge Carrier

C8-S-82a were used by the US Navy and called seabee LASH, (Lighter aboard ship).
 SS Cape May (T-AKR-5063) - Built as SS Almeria Lykes C8-S-82a
 SS Cape Mohican (T-AKR-5065) built as the SS Tillie Lykes C8-S-82a
 SS Cape Mendocino (T-AKR-5064) - Built as SS Doctor Lykes C8-S-82a. In October 2011 she was moved to the James River Reserve Fleet to the Beaumont Reserve Fleet to the Beaumont Reserve Fleet.

Lash Lighter Basin
In San Francisco, California is Lash Lighter Basin, located by Heron's Head Park in San Francisco Bay. The Lash Lighter Basin at Bayview–Hunters Point, San Francisco is a protected port that is used by C8-class ships for loading and unloading lighter-barges. Barges from the Stockton Deepwater Shipping Channel, Sacramento Deep Water Ship Channel and Sacramento–San Joaquin River Delta are taken to Lash Lighter Basin.

Notable incident
 On May 21, 2001, the SS Cape Mohican (T-AKR 5065) was participating in an exercise at Chilpo Beach, just north of Pohang, South Korea. While in the harbor, heavy winds caused her to drag anchor approximately 150 feet and run aground on rocks, causing damage to her hull and internal tanks. This damage required salvage work and emergency dry-docking along with 1500 tons of steel to make her seaworthy again

Type C9 ships

In 1980 Avondale Industries built two 41,500 DWT Type C9-S-81f barge carriers: the SS Edward Rutledge (now SS Spirit and the SS Edward Rutledge (Now SS Reliance). In 1974-75 Avondale Industries built nine 41,000  DWT C9-S-81d barge carriers, some used by the US Navy. C9-S-81d examples are the SS Delta Norte and the SS Delta Mar built in 1971. In 1980-83 Avondale Industries also built three C9-M-132b, but these are 32,800 DWT container ships built for the American President Line: President Washington (now M/V Manoa), President Lincoln (now M/V Mahimahi) and President Monroe (now M/V Mokihana).

Design C8-S-81b ships

Design C8-S-82a ships

See also
 Type C4 ship
 T2 tanker
 Liberty ship
 Victory ship

References

Auxiliary ship classes of the United States Navy